INCOSE Pioneer Award is an annual prize for people who have made significant pioneering contributions to the field of Systems Engineering given by the INCOSE (International Council on Systems Engineering) since 1997.

Winners 
Source: INCOSE
 1997: Simon Ramo
 1998: Derek Hitchins
 1999: Eberhardt Rechtin
 2000: Wolt Fabrycky, Benjamin S. Blanchard
 2001: Harold Mooz, Kevin Forsberg
 2002: Andrew Sage
 2003: A. Wayne Wymore
 2006: Philip M'Pherson
 2007: John N. Warfield
 2008: Peter Checkland
 2009: Lui Pao Chuen
 2010: Julian M. Goldman
 2011: Azad Madni, Xue-Shen Qian
 2012: Jung Uck Seo
 2015: Norm Augustine
 2016: Harold W. Lawson
 2017: Hans Mark
 2018: Suresh B. N.
 2019: Barry Boehm
 2020:	Odd A. Asbjornsen and Arthur B. Pyster

See also

 List of engineering awards
 List of systems engineers
 IEEE Simon Ramo Medal

References 

Systems sciences awards
Awards established in 1997